Cissi Cleve born Cecilie Schou Cleve (17 December 1911 – 27 December 1993), was an operatic singer and composer, and the daughter of the composer Halfdan Cleve.

Biography 
Cleve danced ballet for 14 years, and studied under Per Aabel and Lowe Krohn. She performed together with Sonja Henie at Centralteatret on spectacle, as well as at the National Theatre (Oslo) for the royals. At the age of 21 she got the Ruud-scholarship for 4 years in a row, and studied singing in Vienna. Later she was engaged for six weeks at the Cairo Opera House as part of the Vienna State Opera.

Cleve was awarded the Leharmedaljen by Franz Lehár personally. She was engaged for three years by the Nuremberg Opera, until the outbreak of 2nd world war. She was a member of Tono since she was 19 years old, and have as composer released 15 piano pieces and 2 pieces for Janitsjar Orchestra, as well as 14 pieces for orchestra. Her music has been played in NRK Radio by Kringkastingsorkesteret on several occasions. Cleve received Ruudstipendium for singers over a period of four years, won a grant from the artists' compensation fund four times, and two times scholarship from Tono.

References 

1911 births
1993 deaths
Norwegian composers
20th-century Norwegian women opera singers